S. C. Sadayappa Mudaliar was an Indian politician and former Member of the Legislative Assembly of Tamil Nadu. He was elected to the Tamil Nadu legislative assembly as an Indian National Congress candidate from Arakkonam constituency in 1957 election.

References 

Year of birth missing
Possibly living people
Indian National Congress politicians from Tamil Nadu